Sir Thomas John Burke, 3rd Baronet DL (7 June 1813 – 9 December 1875) was an Irish landowner and politician from County Galway who was an independent Liberal MP for Galway County (1847–65).

Career
Born at Marble Hill, he sat as an independent liberal Member of Parliament for the Galway County for eighteen years. His father, John Burke, was MP for the same constituency from 1830 to 1832.

Sport
Sometime a captain in the 1st Royals, he was best known for his love of sport, and his connection with horse racing is preserved through the Marble Hill Stakes annually run for at the Curragh. He has been described as "a genial, handsome man, exceedingly popular with the country people, but by no means as prudent and business like as his father". He married Lady Mary Nugent, daughter of Anthony Francis Nugent, 9th Earl of Westmeath.

Arms

References

External links 

1813 births
1875 deaths
Baronets in the Baronetage of Ireland
Deputy Lieutenants in Ireland
Members of the Parliament of the United Kingdom for County Galway constituencies (1801–1922)
Politicians from County Galway
Royal Scots officers
UK MPs 1847–1852
UK MPs 1852–1857
UK MPs 1857–1859
UK MPs 1859–1865
Irish officers in the British Army
Thomas